The 2009 All-Australian team represents the best performed Australian Football League (AFL) players during the 2009 season. It was announced on 14 September, as a complete Australian rules football team of 22 players. An initial squad of 40 players was previously announced on 1 September. The team is honorary and does not play any games.

Selection panel
The selection panel for the 2009 All-Australian team consisted of non-voting chairman Andrew Demetriou, Adrian Anderson, Kevin Bartlett, Gerard Healy, James Hird, Glen Jakovich, Mark Ricciuto and Robert Walls.

Team

Initial squad
A squad of 40 players, consisting of 12 defenders, 12 forwards and 16 midfielders/ruckmen was announced on 1 September. The top four teams after the home and away season provided 24 of the 40 players selected in the initial squad, with the bottom eight teams only providing seven players.

Controversial omissions from the squad include former Brownlow Medallists Simon Black and Jason Akermanis, as well as prolific midfielders Jobe Watson, Scott Thompson, Bryce Gibbs, Aaron Davey, Joel Corey and Daniel Cross. Dane Swan was surprisingly named as a forward, despite playing mainly as a midfielder and only scoring 17 goals during the season.

Final team
Nick Riewoldt was named as captain of the All-Australian team for the first time. Nine players were selected for the first time, with Matthew Scarlett and Simon Goodwin receiving their fifth respective selections.

The most controversial selections were the selection of  pair Leon Davis and midfielder Dane Swan as forwards, despite kicking only 34 and 18 goals respectively, ahead of Mark LeCras who kicked 58 goals for the season and Jason Porplyzia who kicked 52 goals.

Note: the position of coach in the All-Australian team is traditionally awarded to the coach of the premiership team.

References

All-Australian Team, 2009
All-Australian Team